Mbube is a form of South African vocal music, made famous by the South African group Ladysmith Black Mambazo. The word mbube means "lion" in Zulu. Traditionally performed a cappella, the members of the group are male although a few groups have a female singer. In this form, groups of voices singing homophonically in rhythmic unison are employed to create intricate harmonies and textures.

Background

In Johannesburg, Solomon Linda, a man from Natal, created one of the most famous African songs, "Mbube", which eventually became its own genre. In 1933 Linda began singing with a group of friends called the Evening Birds. In 1939 they recorded a few tacks for Gallo Records when Linda improvised the first 15 notes of a song they called "Mbube". The success of this song led to the conception of a whole new genre, characterized by a loud and powerful cappella four part harmony, accompanied by dancing. The song was later made internationally famous, by The Weavers as "Wimoweh" in 1948 and then as "The Lion Sleeps Tonight" by the Tokens in 1961. Miriam Makeba's recording of "The Lion Sleeps Tonight" in the 1960s helped popularize the genre and establish the singing tradition. But it was Robert John’s rendition of "The Lion Sleeps Tonight" that is the most well-known, reaching #3 on the US charts, and selling more than one million copies for which he was awarded a gold disc by the Recording Industry Association of America.

Associated with poor migrant workers, the origins of Mbube can be traced back to the 1920s in the Natal region when the area became heavily industrialized with coalmines and factories. According to Joseph Shabalala (leader and founder of Ladysmith Black Mambazo), young South African Zulu men from nearby towns and villages began to flock to this area to find work, often in mines.  These men brought with them their own cultures and, in order to preserve a sense of community, formed choirs. These male workers were often lodging in hostels where they created a weekend social life that revolved around singing and dancing. There were competitions where the best groups would showcase their talents and a winner would be awarded not with money, but honor. As these competitions became more popular so did this new style of music. It spread to Johannesburg, one of the largest South African cities. Mbube is a precursor to the more currently popular African choral genres mbaqanga and iscathamiya. Since the formation of Ladysmith Black Mambazo, the mbube has fallen out of style in favor of isicathamiya, which is a softer, lighter genre.

Citations

General sources 
 Mbube Roots, Rounder Records #5025
 AMARYONI Artist Biography African Cream Music, Johannesburg, South Africa. Retrieved 14 November 2008
 Broughton, Simon, and Kim Burton. World Music: the Rough Guide. London: Rough Guides, 1994. Print
 Malan, Rian. "In the Jungle". Rolling Stone. 25 May 2000. Web. "Africa". Def. 5. Southern Africa. Credo Reference. Harvard Dictionary of Music, 2003. Web. 31 Mar. 2011.
 Johnson, Keith. "Mbube". AllMusic. N.p., n.d. Web. 31 Mar. 2011.
 Wassel, Deborah. "From Mbube to Wimoweh: African Folk Music in Dual Systems of Law". Fordham Intellectual Property, Media & Entertainment Law Journal XX.1 (2009): 290–326. Fordham Law Blog. Web. 31 Mar. 2011.

Further reading 
 Erlmann, Veit, Horses in the Race Course': The Domestication of Ingoma Dancing in South Africa, 1929–39", Popular Music, Vol. 8, No. 3, African Music (Oct. 1989), pp. 259–273. . Cambridge University Press. Collected in: Nightsong: Power, Performance, and Practice in South Africa. University of Chicago Press (1995) https://books.google.com/books?id=FcNIuMDsEV8C&printsec=frontcover.
 Frith, Simon, Popular music: critical concepts in media and cultural studies, Volume 4, London: Routledge, 2004. . Cf. p. 271
 Xulu, M. K., The Re-emergence of Amahubo Songs, Styles and Ideas in Modern Zulu Musical Styles. PhD dissertation, University of Natal. 1992.
 Mbube website official

Zulu music
South African styles of music

fi:Mbube